The city government of San Diego tracks crime in San Diego and has published crime statistics since 1950. In San Diego, the crime rate is relatively low compared to the rest of the United States. Several news sources ranked San Diego within the top twenty safest cities in the United States since 2010. In 2017, the crime rate in San Diego was the lowest it had ever been since 1959. Despite the city's low crime rate, San Diego is a major port in the international illegal drug trade, especially when it comes to fentanyl and methamphetamine, which is being produced and trafficked by the Sinaloa Cartel. In the 1980s, the city was called the meth capital of the United States and in modern times it has been dubbed the ‘epicenter of fentanyl trafficking in the United States’ by some local news sources. Human smuggling is also an issue for San Diego and nearby areas in recent years which is also augmented by the Mexican cartels. The city has also faced scandals from public officials over the decades, with several mayors being forced to resign.

Overview 
In 2006, Police Chief William Lansdowne said that San Diego became the sixth-safest city among those in the country with at least 500,000 people in 2004. In 2005, the violent crime rate reached a 25-year low at 4.5 crimes per 1,000 population. Since 2010, news organizations have included San Diego among the twenty safest cities in the United States: 9th in 2010 by Forbes, 20th in 2012 by Business Insider, and 12th in 2019 by U.S. News & World Report. In 2017, the Federal Bureau of Investigation named San Diego the safest big city in the U.S. due to its homicide rate in 2016. The violent crime rate of the city in 2017 was 3.7 per 1,000 people, the lowest among the ten most populous cities in the country.

Crime rate 
The following chart contains the annual crime rate per 1,000 population of the city of San Diego since 1950:

Actual crimes 
The following chart contains the actual crimes committed in the city of San Diego every year since 1950 (does not take population growth or decline into account):

Crime by category

Criminal organizations 

As of 2014, there are 4,100 gang members in 91 gangs in the city of San Diego, according to police lieutenant Keith Lucas. In 2013, the San Diego Association of Governments (SANDAG) published a county-wide gang arrestees report on the preceding year and found that the average initiation age of gang members was 13.5 years and 61 percent of arrestees reported that they had family members who were also gang members. In the report, the law enforcement agencies in the county informed SANDAG that gangs commit about a quarter of all crimes in the county.

Drug trafficking 

In the 1980s, San Diego held the dubious distinction of being the meth capital of the United States. In the 1960s, the Hells Angels motorcycle club was the chief distributor of meth in the state, and production across the southern border in Mexico was mostly unimpeded by law enforcement, allowing for the drug to be widely available in San Diego.

In 2000, the National Drug Intelligence Center published a threat assessment on drugs in the Southern District of California. It found that, while the California–Mexico border comprised about 7 percent of the southwest border, it made up 18 percent of the drug seizures in the region. The assessment stated that all drugs of abuse—meth, black tar heroin, and marijuana in particular—were readily available and supplied by Mexican drug trafficking organizations. In 2014, California Attorney General Kamala Harris issued a report that stated that about 70 percent of the meth from Mexico came through San Diego's ports of entry, outpacing border communities in Arizona and Texas since 2009. U.S. Immigration and Customs Enforcement spokesperson Lauren Mack hypothesized that the city's proximity to Mexico, its position on a central smuggling corridor, and its easy freeway access to points of high demand could be reasons for that fact. The spokesperson said that San Diego used to be a meth production hub, but production moved across the border into Tijuana and Baja California. Mack also stated that the Sinaloa Cartel played a significant role in the region's ongoing meth trade.

Currently, as of the early 2020s however; fentanyl has seen a significant rise in production and output and has now become the most major concern for citizens and law enforcement in regards to the trafficking and abuse of drugs that occur in and around the city. Most of the fentanyl being trafficked, whether raw powder or fake pressed-pills designed to look like pharmaceuticals, is primarily being manufactured and smuggled into the city by the Sinaloa Cartel whom still also traffic heavily in methamphetamine and cocaine as well. Heroin, particularly high-purity heroin however has notably dropped in prevalence due to fentanyl now dominating the black market trade of opioids in San Diego as well as in most major cities across the nation. According to law enforcement officials, fentanyl has even made it into the local jails where it has proven to be a notable problem there as well, leading to several inmate deaths as of 2022.

Public corruption 

In 1985, San Diego mayor Roger Hedgecock resigned from his position after a jury found him guilty of committing 13 felony charges for conspiring with several prominent supporters to funnel more than $360,000 in illegal contributions into his campaign and subsequent perjury. In 2005, mayor Dick Murphy and several other officials resigned while there was an ongoing investigation into the city's pension fund. Two members of the San Diego City Council, including deputy mayor Michael Zucchet, were also subjects in another federal investigation case. A federal jury convicted then-acting mayor Zucchet and councilman Ralph Inzunza in July for accepting bribes from a strip club owner  to promote the repeal of a "no touch" law. In 2013, mayor Bob Filner resigned amid sexual harassment allegations. Several months later, Filner pleaded guilty to one count of false imprisonment and two counts of battery.

See also 
 Crime in California
 Smuggling tunnel
 List of California street gangs

References

External links 
 San Diego Police Department
 San Diego Crime Statistics and Maps

San Diego
San Diego
San Diego